Karoline Smidt Nielsen (born 12 May 1994) is a Danish former footballer who played as an attacking midfielder for Turbine Potsdam of the German Frauen-Bundesliga as well as for the Denmark women's national football team.

Club career
Smidt Nielsen joined Fortuna Hjørring from OB Odense in summer 2012. She began playing in the boys' team at HPTI from being four years old, then played for B 1913 from 11 to 15, then joined OB where she played her first matches in the Danish Women's League.

She was forced to retire in October 2022, following a series of injuries which restricted her to nine appearances for her German club Turbine Potsdam since joining them in 2018.

International career
In December 2012 Smidt Nielsen made her senior international debut as a second-half substitute for Pernille Harder in Denmark's 5–0 win over Mexico in São Paulo, Brazil.

She was selected in national coach Kenneth Heiner-Møller's Denmark squad for UEFA Women's Euro 2013.

Personal life
Karoline's mother Lone Smidt Nielsen (née Hansen) is also a former international footballer, who played professionally in Italy.

Honours

Club
Fortuna Hjørring
Winner
 Elitedivisionen: 2013-14, 2015-16, 2017-18
 Danish Women's Cup: 2016

References

External links

 Karoline Smidt Nielsen at the Danish Football Union (DBU)
 
 Karoline Smidt Nielsen at Soccerdonna.de
 

1994 births
Living people
Danish women's footballers
Denmark women's international footballers
Fortuna Hjørring players
Odense Q players
Frauen-Bundesliga players
1. FFC Turbine Potsdam players
Women's association football midfielders
Expatriate women's footballers in Germany
Danish expatriate sportspeople in Germany
Footballers from Odense
Danish expatriate men's footballers